Unser Land is a political party in the French region of Alsace, established in 2009. It is member of the Fédération Régions et Peuples Solidaires in France and the European Free Alliance of the European Union.

It was formed after Union du peuple alsacien (founded in 1988) and Fer's Elsass (founded in 2002) merged in 2009.

See also
 Alsace d'abord
 Alemannic separatism

Political parties established in 2009
Political parties in Alsace
Alsace independence movement
German diaspora political parties
European Free Alliance